Berte Rognerud (29 March 1907  –  27 January 1997) was a Norwegian politician for the Conservative Party.

She was born in Østre Toten.

She was elected to the Norwegian Parliament from Oslo in 1954, and was re-elected on four occasions.

References

1907 births
1997 deaths
Conservative Party (Norway) politicians
Members of the Storting
20th-century Norwegian politicians
People from Østre Toten